Scouting in British Columbia has a long history, from the 1900s to the present day, serving thousands of youth in programs that suit the environment in which they live.

Anglophone Scouting in British Columbia

British Columbia is administratively connected to Yukon.

Councils

Cascadia Council - Most of British Columbia and Vancouver Island
Fraser Valley Council - Most of the Fraser Valley, Nicomekl Area, Three Rivers Area, Coho Area, West SurDel Area, Green Timbers Area, Fraser Cheam
Pacific Coast Council - Pacific Spirit, East Vancouver, North Shore, Richmond, Burnaby. Whistler, the Sea to Sky corridor and the sunshine coast are administered through the Council office directly.

Local Groups and sections
In addition to typical groups, there are some vocational Company and Crews that serve special interests.

 The 180th Pacific Coast Rover Scouts are a Leadership and Project Management Crew based in the Lower Mainland.
 89th Richmond Medvents
 24th Fraser Valley Medvents
 Fraser Valley SCUBAvents

The Silver Walnut Award was created by youth in 2005 to recognize outstanding youth leadership outside their own section. The first silver walnuts were presented in April 2006 in British Columbia's Cascadia Council. This award was created by the Cascadia Youth Network and has been approved by the National Council for use on youth uniforms. The award was since nationalized as the Medal of the Maple- a youth award for all councils.

Camp Byng

Camp Byng  is a  Scouts Canada camping facility located in Roberts Creek on the Sunshine Coast, a 40-minute ferry ride from Horseshoe Bay Terminal, Vancouver, British Columbia.  The facility was host of the British Columbia Provincial Jamboree 2007, also known as the Pacific Jamboree. Camp Byng recently hosted the 2011 Pacific Jamboree on July 9 to July 16, 2011. Over 3,200 participants and volunteers attended.

The facility has over a mile of oceanfront property, archery range, two playing fields, high and low ropes course with a zip line, four lodges with indoor cooking facilities as well as wilderness campsites.  Outdoor showers are provided throughout the site.

Camp Barnard 
Camp Barnard is a 250-acre (1.01 km2) Scouts Canada camping facility located in Otter Point, just west of Sooke on Vancouver Island.  The site is centered around 17-acre Young Lake and was host of the Provincial Jamboree (PJ) in 1974, 1982, 1987, 2015 and 2019.

The facility has a swimming area, dock, boat house with canoes and kayaks, archery range, two Lodges, four cabin circles and a playing field.

Francophone Scouting in British Columbia

The first Association des Scouts du Canada Wolf Cub (Louveteaux) pack was formed in 1955 in Maillardville. A second pack followed in 1956 in the same town. In 1957, the first group of Scouts (Éclaireurs) was formed.

Girl Guiding in British Columbia

Girl Guides are served by the British Columbia Council of Girl Guides of Canada.

SOAR
SOAR stands for Spirit of Adventure Rendezvous. It is held every three years in British Columbia for Girl Guides of all levels from all over Canada and abroad.

SOAR 2011 was held in Agassiz, British Columbia, from July 23–30, 2011.

Agassiz is a friendly agricultural community situated in the rich alluvial floodplain of the Fraser Valley. It is located on the north bank of the Fraser River, southwest of Hope, east of Vancouver, and south of Harrison Hot Springs. It features a host of outdoor activities, cultural events, historical sites, and museums. SOAR will be located on the Agricultural Fairgrounds also known as Centennial Park.

SOAR 2007 was held between July 20–28, 2007 at the Seven Springs Camp and Retreat Centre near Parksville. The camp's theme was Mysteries of the Sea.

SOAR 2004 opened on 2004-07-24. It was held in Merritt at the Merritt Mountain Music Festival site and 2,700 girls and leaders attended.

Ranger Advisory Council
British Columbian Rangers (Guides aged 15–18+) elect an advisory council each year. This occurs after their Annual General Meeting, which is held at their annual spring training and camp. This training, the Ranger RACket, is open to Rangers across British Columbia and their travel is subsidized by the British Columbia Council of Girl Guides of Canada. Five girls are elected each year and produce newsletter and plan the next Ranger RACket. In 2009, the event was renamed to reflect changes in the Canadian Girl Guiding program. Previously, the event was open to all members of the Senior Branches and was known as CAJURA (to stand for Cadets, Junior Leaders, and Rangers).

See also

Baden-Powell Trail
Scouting in Alaska
Scouting in Idaho
Scouting in Montana
Scouting in Washington
Scouting in Wisconsin

References

External links
British Columbia and Yukon Scouting
BC Girl Guides
Les Scouts francophones de la Colombie-Britannique
SOAR 2007

Scouting and Guiding in Canada